Olivia Aya Nakitanda (born August 27, 1984) is a Ugandan swimmer who specialized in sprint freestyle events. She represented her nation Uganda at the 2008 Summer Olympics, placing herself among the top 70 swimmers in the 50 m freestyle.

Nakitanda was invited by FINA to compete as a 24-year-old swimmer for the Ugandan team in the women's 50 m freestyle at the 2008 Summer Olympics in Beijing. She threw down a scorching time and a lifetime best of 29.38 seconds to lead the third heat, but placed further in sixty-sixth overall out of ninety-two entrants.

Education 
Nakitanda studied at Kampala Parents School for her primary and then proceeded to Mount Saint Mary's Namagunga for her secondary education.

Nakitanda is a graduate of medicine at Makerere University in Kampala.

References

External links
NBC Olympics Profile

1984 births
Living people
Ugandan female swimmers
Commonwealth Games competitors for Uganda
Swimmers at the 2002 Commonwealth Games
Swimmers at the 2006 Commonwealth Games
Olympic swimmers of Uganda
Swimmers at the 2008 Summer Olympics
Ugandan female freestyle swimmers
Sportspeople from Kampala
Makerere University alumni